"This Christmas" was a Christmas single released by TobyMac in 2002.

Track listing

Personnel 

 TobyMac - vocals
 Trudog - guest vocalist
 Jeff Savage - keyboards
 Michael Ripoll - guitar
 Rod Shuler - DJ cuts
 Nirva Dorsaint - background vocals
 Sandtown (Children of Praise) - choir
 Dave Wyatt - keyboards, organ
 Scott Savage - percussion
 Dave Clo - guitar
 DJ MAJ - cuts

TobyMac songs
2002 singles
2002 songs
ForeFront Records singles
Songs written by TobyMac